Yeva Yaroslavivna Meleshchuk (born 29 September 2001 in Kyiv, Ukraine) is a Ukrainian group and former individual rhythmic gymnast. She is the 2019 Summer Universiade Clubs gold medalist. On national level, she is the 2018 Ukrainian National All-around champion and the 2020 Ukrainian National All-around silver medalist.

Career

Junior
She competed at the 2016 Junior European Championships in Holon, Israel and placed 6th in Team competition together with Olena Diachenko and Khrystyna Pohranychna. She placed 26th in Rope and 16th in Clubs Qualifications.

Senior
In 2017, she became senior. She won bronze medal with Ribbon at the 2017 Ukrainian Championships. She competed with Ribbon at the 2017 European Championships in Budapest, Hungary and placed 6th in Team competition. In 2018, she qualified to Hoop final at World Challenge Cup Guadalajara and finished on 8th place. This was her first World Cup final. She won bronze medal in Ribbon final at Grand Prix in Holon, Israel. Yeva also competed at the 2018 European Championships and placed 12th in All-around. Same year, she won gold medal in All-around at Ukrainian Championships and earned a spot at the 2018 World Championships in Sofia, Bulgaria. She placed 28th in All-around and 5th in Team competition.

In 2019, she won bronze medal in All-around at Ukrainian Championships. She also won gold in Clubs final and silver medals in all other apparatus finals. She won silver medal in Ribbon final at Grand Prix Kyiv. At the 2019 World Challenge Cup Guadalajara she won her first World Cup medal - silver in Ball final, and placed 5th in All-around. She finished on 5th place again at the 2019 World Challenge Cup Portimao and took silver medal in Ribbon final. She competed at the 2019 Summer Universiade in Naples, Italy and won gold medal in Clubs final and bronze medal in Hoop and Ribbon finals. Her second World Championships participation was at the 2019 World Championships in Baku, Azerbaijan where she competed with Clubs and Ribbon, and helped her teammates Vlada Nikolchenko and Khrystyna Pohranychna place 5th in Team competition.

In 2020, she competed at Grand Prix Kyiv and won bronze medal in Ball final behind Alina Harnasko and Anastasiia Salos. She also took part in 2020 European Championships in Kyiv, Ukraine and finished on 6th place in All-around Final.

In 2021, she started the competition season at the 2021 World Cup Sofia and finished on 18th place in All-around and 6th place in Clubs final. Right after, she appeared at the 2021 World Cup Pesaro as a member of senior group. They also competed at the 2021 European Championships. She was selected to represent Ukraine at the 2020 Summer Olympic Games in Tokyo, Japan, where Yeva and her group took 7th place in Group All-around final.

References

External links 
 
 

Living people
2001 births
Gymnasts from Kyiv
Ukrainian rhythmic gymnasts
Medalists at the 2019 Summer Universiade
Universiade gold medalists for Ukraine
Universiade bronze medalists for Ukraine
Universiade medalists in gymnastics
Gymnasts at the 2020 Summer Olympics
Olympic gymnasts of Ukraine
21st-century Ukrainian women